Gulf Township, population 3,363, is one of thirteen townships in Chatham County, North Carolina. Gulf Township does not contain any towns in it.

Geography
The south and southeastern part of Gulf Township are drained by the Deep River and its tributaries, Cedar Creek, Indian Creek, Bear Creek, and Line Creek.  The north is drained by Bear Creek and its tributaries, Harts Creek and Sandy Branch.

References

Townships in Chatham County, North Carolina
Townships in North Carolina